Albania has participated in the Eurovision Song Contest 18 times since its debut in . Festivali i Këngës, a long-standing song contest that takes place every year in Albania since 1962, is used to select the country's entrant for that year's Eurovision Song Contest. It remained the country's highest result in the contest until , when Rona Nishliu finished fifth.

History

2000s 

The national broadcaster of Albania, Radio Televizioni Shqiptar (RTSH), expressed their intention to participate in the 2002 and 2003 Eurovision Song Contests, however they were denied participation due to the large number of countries participating.

However, the country debuted at the 2004 contest in Istanbul with the song "The Image of You" performed by Anjeza Shahini. The country received 106 points in the grand final and finished in the seventh place remaining the country's highest placement until 2012. In 2005, due to the country's top 11 placement the previous year, the succeeding entry "Tomorrow I Go" by Ledina Çelo automatically qualified for the grand final and reached the sixteenth place in Kyiv. The following year, Luiz Ejlli and his entry "Zjarr e ftohtë" failed to qualify for the grand final in Athens simultaneously marking the first time in their participation history.

The 2007 entry was Frederik Ndoci with "Hear My Plea", performed at Festivali I Këngës 45 as "Balada e gurit" (The stone ballad). The song was performed at Eurovision in both English and Albanian. In the semi-final of the 2007 contest he received 49 points, placing 17th of 28 in his semi-final and failing to qualify for the final.

The winner of Festivali I Këngës 46 was "Zemrën e lamë peng" (Hearts trapped in time) by Olta Boka. However the result of the juries that selected the winner was controversial and rumours arose that the final two judges intentionally awarded high marks to Boka in order to avoid sending the runners-up, Flaka Krelani and Doruntina Disha, to the contest. Press reactions in Albania were not happy with the decision, and RTSH announced that they would investigate into alleged cheating by the final two judges to award their points. Despite this, Olta Boka's victory remained, and she sang for Albania at the Eurovision Song Contest 2008 in Belgrade, Serbia. She qualified for the final, coming 9th in a field of 19 in the second semi-final, and in the final she received 55 points, coming equal 17th in a field of 25.

Albania was the first country to select both their artist and publicly present their song for Eurovision 2009. The winner was again selected by Festivali I Këngës. The winner of Festivali I Këngës 47 was Kejsi Tola with the song "Më merr në ëndërr" (Take me in your dreams), which was composed by the composers of Albania's first entry Edmond Zhulali and Agim Doçi. The song was performed in English as "Carry Me in Your Dreams". Albania finished 7th out of 19 in the 2nd semifinal with 73 points, thus qualifying for the final. In the final, where both jury and televoting were used, Albania scored 48 points, finishing 17th in a field of 25. However, had only televoting been used Albania would have placed 11th in the contest. Conversely if only jury voting had been used Albania would have placed 23rd.

2010s 

The winner of Festivali I Këngës 48 was decided on 27 December, with Juliana Pasha winning over former winner Anjeza Shahini. She represented Albania at Eurovision 2010 in Oslo with the song "It's All about You". The song was a typical up-tempo composition, and has been compared to Christina Aguilera's "Keeps Gettin' Better" and Britney Spears' "Womanizer". Albania came 6th in the first semi-final with 76 points, thus qualifying for the final. In the final, Juliana finished 16th with 62 points which included 12 points from Macedonia.

The Albanian participant for the 2011 Eurovision Song Contest was chosen in Festivali i Këngës 49 in December 2010. The winner of 2011's Festival of Song was Aurela Gaçe, winning for the third time after 10 years. Her song was named "Kënga ime" ("My Song") and it was translated into English with the name "Feel the Passion", published on 12 March 2011, during a show called "Historia nis këtu" ("The story begins here") in RTSH. Albania participated in Semi-Final 1 against 18 other countries, fighting for a place in the grand final in 14 May. However they missed out on qualification for the final for the first time in 4 years, coming 14th.

Albania competed in the 2012 competition with the song "Suus", which was performed by Rona Nishliu. The song got through to the final, coming in 5th place overall with 146 points. Rona Nishliu from Kosovo achieved a record result for Albania.

Albania competed in the 2013 Eurovision Song Contest with the song "Identitet" which was performed by Adrian Lulgjuraj and Bledar Sejko. This song was chosen as the winner through the Festivali i Këngës. The results depended on the jury voting only. Among the experts in the jury was the Italian Head of Delegation at the Eurovision Song Contest, Nicola Caligiore, who greeted and gave the points in English for all the viewers from the Eurovision.tv webcast.

Albania came 15th in the second semi-final of the 2013 Eurovision Song Contest in Malmö and did not make it into the grand final.

On 28 December 2013, Herciana Matmuja won Festivali i Këngës 52 (the 52nd national final of Albania) and was therefore chosen to represent Albania in Eurovision 2014 with her song 'Zemërimi i një nate'. In the time before Eurovision 2014 she recorded both English and Albanian versions of this song. On 16 March she released the final version of 'One Night's anger' for Eurovision 2014. Albania failed to qualify for the second year in a row.

On 28 December 2014, Elhaida Dani won Festivali i Këngës 53 with the song "Diell", and this represented Albania at the Eurovision Song Contest 2015. On 23 February 2015 it was announced that the songwriters had decided to withdraw the song and Dani would perform something else at Eurovision. The following day it was revealed that Dani would perform "I'm Alive".

On 27 December 2015 Eneda Tarifa won Festivali i Këngës 54 with her song "Përrallë" which meant she would represent Albania in the Eurovision Song Contest 2016. It was later translated into English and called "Fairytale", and the music video premiered on the evening news on TVSH. Albania failed to qualify, coming only 16th out of 18 in the second semi-final.

After failing to qualify once again in 2017 with Lindita and the song "World", Albania returned to the grand final in 2018 with the song "Mall" by Eugent Bushpepa. It finished 11th of 26 in the final receiving 184 points, giving Albania its third best result in the contest since their debut.

In 2019, Albania selected Jonida Maliqi to represent them with the song "Ktheju tokës". Albania succeeded in qualifying from the second semi-final, making it the first time Albania had qualified twice in a row since 2009 and 2010. In the final, she placed 17th with 90 points.

2020s
For the  contest, Albania selected Arilena Ara to represent their country after she won Festivali i Këngës 58 with the song "Shaj" on 22 December 2019. On 9 March 2020, a revamped version of the song named "Fall from the Sky" was released in English. However, the 2020 contest was cancelled on 18 March 2020 due to the COVID-19 pandemic in Europe.

For the  contest, RTSH announced that Arilena Ara would not be internally re-selected to represent Albania, and that Festivali i Këngës 59 would go ahead as planned. The national final took place on 23 December 2020 and was won by Anxhela Peristeri with the song "Karma". Anxhela managed to qualify for the final, making it the first time since 2008-2010 that Albania qualified three times in a row. In the final, she placed 21st with 57 points.

For the  contest, Ronela Hajati won Festivali i Këngës 60 and was selected to represent the country with the song "Sekret". It underwent a revamp ahead of Eurovision which saw lines in English and Spanish being added. However, it failed to qualify for the final, coming 12th out of 17 in the first semi-final.

Participation overview

Related involvement

Commentators and spokespersons 

For the contest's broadcast on Radio Televizioni Shqiptar (RTSH), various commentators and spokespersons have been hired throughout the years, with Leon Menkshi and Andri Xhahu notably having done the job on eight and ten occasions respectively. At Eurovision, after all points are calculated, the presenters of the show call upon each voting country to invite their respective spokesperson to announce the results of their vote on-screen.

Awards

Gallery

See also 

 Albania in the Eurovision Young Dancers
 Albania in the Eurovision Young Musicians
 Albania in the Junior Eurovision Song Contest

Notes

References 

 

 
Countries in the Eurovision Song Contest